The 2014 Asian Cycling Championships took place at the Saryarka Velodrome in Astana and Karaganda, Kazakhstan from 21 May to 1 June 2014.

Medal summary

Road

Men

Women

Track

Men

Women

Medal table

Results
Results Men
Results Women

External links
 Asian Cycling Federation
 2014 Asian Cycling Championships official website
 Results book – Road
 Results book – Track

Asia
Asia
Asian Cycling Championships
Cycling in Kazakhstan
International sports competitions hosted by Kazakhstan
Cycling Championships
Asian Cycling Championships
Asian Cycling Championships
Sport in Karaganda